Cash rounding or Swedish rounding (New Zealand English) occurs when the minimum unit of account is smaller than the lowest physical denomination of currency. The amount payable for a cash transaction is rounded to the nearest multiple of the minimum currency unit available, whereas transactions paid in other ways are not rounded (for example electronic funds transfer like credit cards, or negotiable instruments like cheques). Cash rounding typically occurs when low-denomination coins are removed from circulation owing to inflation. Cash rounding may be a compulsory legal requirement if such coins are no longer legal tender, or a voluntary practice where they remain in circulation but are scarce or impractical.

Cash rounding ("öre rounding") was introduced in Sweden in 1972 when 1 and 2 öre coins were withdrawn from circulation, and has continued to be applied at incremental levels as smaller denomination coins have been withdrawn. The current level of cash rounding in Sweden is to the closest whole krona, after the 50 öre coin was withdrawn in 2010. The Reserve Bank of New Zealand used the name "Swedish rounding" in 1990 when withdrawing their 1- and 2-cent coins. In Canada, cash rounding to nearest nickel (5 cents) due to the elimination of the penny in 2013 is also called penny rounding.

When small-value coins are withdrawn, an alternative to the implementation of cash rounding is instead to increase the minimum unit of account to the smallest remaining currency unit and to round all prices and bank accounts to this value. Whereas cash rounding is an ongoing process, this alternative is a one-time conversion. It was done, for example, when the British farthing was withdrawn in 1960.

Practice 
Rounding is applied to the total of a bill, not to the line items on the bill. Typically, the total is rounded to the nearest multiple of the smallest denomination, which may be higher or lower than the unrounded total. Where the unrounded total is an equal distance from two multiples, practice varies: merchants may be required or encouraged to round down rather than up, giving the benefit to the buyer. An equal distance is possible when the rounding interval is an even number.

The introduction of cash rounding is typically accompanied by publicity campaigns for awareness among both consumers and implementing merchants; smaller campaigns will accompany the extension of an existing rounding system to a higher rounding interval.

Rounding with 0.05 or 5 intervals 

 Prices are rounded down to the nearest multiple of 5 cents for sales ending in: 1¢ & 2¢ (rounded to 0¢); and 6¢ & 7¢ (rounded to 5¢). This is done, for example, in Canada. 
 Prices are rounded up to the nearest multiple of 5 cents for sales ending in: 3¢ & 4¢ (round to 5¢); and 8¢ & 9¢ (round to 10¢). This is also done in Canada, for example. 
 Values ending in 0¢ or 5¢ remain unchanged.

Rounding with 0.10 or 10 intervals 

This is currently used in New Zealand, which eliminated its 5 cent coin in 2006, and in Hong Kong, which eliminated its 5 cent coin in 1989 and 1 cent coin in 1995. In practice only utility bills, petrol stations and banks still keep the cent. All other businesses use only ten cent intervals.
 round down to the nearest 10 cent value for sales ending in 1 to 4 cents;
 round up to the nearest 10 cent value for sales ending in 5 to 9 cents;
 it is up to the business to decide if it will round 5¢ intervals up or down. The majority of retailers follow government advice and round it down.

In Sweden between 1985 and 1992, prices were rounded up for sales ending in 5 öre.

In China, coins smaller than 1 jiao (¥0.1 or 10 fen) are now rare though still valid. As a result, many shops simply truncate their bills down to the next 1-jiao increment, giving the customer a discount of up to 9 fen; however, many other stores round sales to the nearest jiao values, and 5 fen is usually rounded up.

In Chile, the 1 and 5 peso coins were withdrawn on November 1, 2017 (but still legal tender), and rounding for cash transactions was implemented, prices are rounded down to the nearest 10 pesos if the value is $1–5, and rounded up if the value is $6–9. Most prices are already rounded to the nearest 10 pesos, and many small businesses round to 50 or 100 pesos due to the low value and availability of lower denominations.

In Israel, 5 agorot coins were removed from circulation on 1 January 2008, after 1 agora coins had already been removed in 1991. Transaction amounts can still be specified to the nearest agora. Cash purchase totals are rounded to the nearest 10 agorot. A 5 agorot total is rounded up to 10 agorot.

In South Korea, the 1- and 5-won coins are not used (but still legal tender). Prices are generally rounded to the nearest 10 won (though generally to the nearest 50 or 100 won in many stores apart from supermarkets), and cash payments are rounded to the same.

In Ukraine, from 1 October 2019, the 1-, 2- & 5-kopiyka coins were demonetized and withdrawn from circulation, with the 25-kopiyok coin softly withdrawn. From then all cash payments would be rounded to the nearest 10 kopiyok.

Rounding with 0.25 intervals 
The system used in Denmark from 1989 to 2008 is the following:
Sales ending in 1–12 øre round down to 0 øre.
Sales ending in 13–37 øre round to 25 øre.
Sales ending in 38–62 øre round to 50 øre.
Sales ending in 63–87 øre round to 75 øre.
Sales ending in 88–99 øre round up to the next whole krone.

Rounding with 0.50 intervals 
The system used in Sweden from 1992 to 2010, in Norway from 1993 to 2012, and in Denmark since 1 October 2008 is the following:
Sales ending in 1–24 öre/øre round down to 0 öre.
Sales ending in 25–49 öre/øre round up to 50 öre.
Sales ending in 51–74 öre/øre round down to 50 öre.
Sales ending in 75–99 öre/øre round up to the next whole krona.

In practice, the proportion of transactions rounded upwards is greater, due to psychological pricing of items ending in 90–99 öre. Rounding is only done on the total sum of a purchase, which makes that effect smaller. In some shops, all prices are already rounded to the whole krone, so that no rounding takes place.

Rounding with 1.00 intervals 
The system used in Sweden since 30 September 2010 and used in Norway since 1 May 2012.
Sales ending in 1–49 öre/øre round down to 0 öre/øre.
Sales ending in 50–99 öre/øre round up to the next whole krona/krone.

This is also the system similarly used in Jamaica since 15 February 2018, when the 1c, 10c, and 25c coins of the dollar were demonetised.
Sales ending in 1–49 cents round down to zero cents.
Sales ending in 50–99 cents round up to the next whole dollar.

See also
 Mil (currency)
 Penny debate in the United States
 Take a penny, leave a penny

References

Cash